Moscow Mills is a former town in Morgan County, in the U.S. state of Ohio. The GNIS classifies it as a populated place.

History
A post office called Moscow Mills was established in 1837, and remained in operation until 1907. In 1886, Moscow Mills was one of three post offices within Center Township.

References

Unincorporated communities in Morgan County, Ohio
Unincorporated communities in Ohio
1837 establishments in Ohio